Stealing Elvis is an independent feature film (96 mins) made by Ragged Crow film production company.

Written and Produced by Sam Edwards and Directed by Ed Edwards, Stealing Elvis (2010), premiered at The Moving Picture Company, London, W1, debuted at London's Portobello Film Festival, where it was *Nominated* for Best Soundtrack, screened at Framestore, London, W1, The Society Film Club at The Sanctum Soho, London, W1, was the Opening Film at the London Independent Film Festival 2011, was *Nominated* for the Grand Jury Prize at The London United Film Festival 2012 (The United Film Festivals), and *Won* an award in the Best Crime Drama category at The Indie Gathering International Film Festival 2012.

Plot
Frank and Danny rob a bank. They hook up with Alice and Kristina on a wild night out.  Kristina finds out about the money and plots to steal it for herself...

Cast
Starring: Naomi Baxter, Charlotte Fine, Max Warrick and Kristian Jenkins

Reception
"With their debut feature film, Stealing Elvis, the independent British production company Ragged Crow, have pulled off an impressive feat... particularly noteworthy are the performances of Naomi Baxter and Charlotte Fine as the two 17 year olds, Kristina and Alice...  what Ragged Crow have managed to achieve is commendable as it is full of hope and positivity for their future projects."
- Guy Sangster Adams, PLECTRUM - The Cultural Pick, magazine issue 9 (June/July 2011)

"Ragged Crow show... if you want to make a movie, you don't have to be an LA Mogul to do so."
- Dan Carrier, The Camden New Journal, 31 May 2012.

References

External links  
stealingelvis.com 

2010s crime drama films
British crime drama films